Małowice may refer to the following places in Poland:
Małowice, Lower Silesian Voivodeship (south-west Poland)
Małowice, Lubusz Voivodeship (west Poland)